NUST SRC is the legal student representative body of the Namibia University of Science and Technology students in Namibia. Based on Windhoek, it was formed in 1995 and represents 19 000 students of the university's student population.

Leaders
Some of the NUST SRC leaders include;

See also
Namibia National Students Organization
Students Politics in Namibia
UNAM SRC

External links
NUST SRC official website

References

Namibia University of Science and Technology
Student organisations based in Namibia